"My Mom's Having a Baby" is a 1977 episode of the American television anthology series ABC Afterschool Special, which aired on February 16, 1977. The episode would be historic as it was the first television program of its kind in the United States to showcase the pregnancy process and conception to young people, using a combination of animation and live action.

Premise
Upon learning that his mother is pregnant with what will be his brother, 10-year-old Petey Evans begins to wonder (through animated fantasies and flashbacks) about how babies are born, only to realize that those theories are not delivered by storks or popping out of a stomach. So, with help from his friends Oskar and Kelly, they go to a real expert who will be performing the delivery, Dr. Lendon Smith, who uses an animated film that explains in detail (via Smith's narration) of how a pregnancy begins and how the child is conceived.

The remaining portion of this program features an actual live birth being performed in front of the cameras, which was taken from a 1974 ABC's Wide World of Entertainment special called David Hartman: Birth & Babies. Actress Candace Farrell, who played the mother in this program, was pregnant at the time of filming the 1974 special, which resulted in the producers hiring her for this program.

Awards
 This program won a Daytime Emmy Award in 1977 for Outstanding Children's Informational Special.

Cast
 Shane Sinutko as Petey Evans
 Jarred Johnson as Oskar
 Rachael Longaker as Kelly
 Lendon Smith as himself
 Candace Farrell as Anne Evans

See also
 Where Do Teenagers Come From?, the 1980 sequel to this program.

References

External links
 
 Review from MSN movies

1977 American television episodes
ABC Afterschool Special episodes
Pregnancy-themed television episodes
Sex education